is a stable of sumo wrestlers, part of the Isegahama ichimon or group of stables. It was formed by former sekiwake Aminishiki in December 2022 after he became independent from Isegahama stable. An opening event for new stable supporters was held later that same month. As of January 2023, the stable has 3 wrestlers with 2 wrestlers actively competing.

The stable is located in the Kōtō ward of Tokyo. It is temporarily based in the Senda District, with plans to move to a permanent location in the Ishijima District in July 2023.

Owners
2022–present: 8th Ajigawa (shunin, former sekiwake Aminishiki)

Location and access
8-7 Senda, Kōtō-ku, Tokyo
10-minute walk from Sumiyoshi station on the Toei Shinjuku Line and the Hanzōmon Line

See also
List of sumo stables
List of past sumo wrestlers
Glossary of sumo terms

References

External links
Official site 
Japan Sumo Association profile

Active sumo stables